Aghinlig is a townland of 509 acres in County Armagh, Northern Ireland. It is situated in the civil parish of Loughgall and the historic barony of Armagh.

See also
List of townlands in County Armagh

References

Townlands of County Armagh
Civil parish of Loughgall